Bradina aaronalis is a moth in the family Crambidae. It is found in Guatemala and in Costa Rica.

References

Moths described in 1924
Bradina